Commonwealth Club may refer to:

Organizations
 Commonwealth Club of California, in San Francisco, America's oldest public affairs forum
 Commonwealth Club (Australia), a private members' club in Canberra founded by Frank Lukis
 The Commonwealth Club, a private gentlemen's club in Richmond, Virginia, US
 Commonwealth Club, formerly a private members' club of the Royal Commonwealth Society

See also
 Commonwealth Club Address, a 1932 speech by presidential candidate Franklin Roosevelt
 Commonwealth Jazz Club, a 1965 music television miniseries co-produced in Australia, Canada and the UK
 Commonwealth Golf Club, in Oakleigh South, Victoria, Australia